The following are the national records in athletics in Montserrat maintained by Montserrat's national athletics federation: Montserrat Amateur Athletic Association (MAAA).

Outdoor

Key to tables:

ht = hand timing

A = affected by altitude

# = not ratified by federation

Men

Women

Indoor

Men

Women

References

External links

Montserrat
Records